K-47 is an approximately  state highway in the U.S. state of Kansas. It is an east-west route, and connects small towns and cities in southeast Kansas. K-47's western terminus is at the Fredonia city limits, just west of the intersection with U.S. Route 400 (US-400). The eastern terminus is US-69 in Franklin. Along the way, it intersects several major highways including US-75 in Altoona, US-59 south of Erie, and K-7 in Girard. With the exception of the cities K-47 passes through, the highway travels through rural farmland.

K-47 was established as a state highway in 1928, to a highway that ran from Fredonia northeast to Buffalo. By 1929, it was extended east from Fredonia, through Altoona to modern day US-169 south of Chanute. By 1930, K-47 was truncated to end by Fredonia, with the former section between there and Benedict becoming a realignment of K-39. In 1937, K-47 was extended from Fredonia in a northwest direction, along the former alignment of K-96, through New Albany to new K-96. K-47 was extended east to US-59 south of Erie by 1950. In 1953, K-47's western terminus was truncated back to Fredonia. In 2003, K-47 was extended east over the former K-57 to US-69 by Franklin.

Route description 
The Kansas Department of Transportation (KDOT) tracks the traffic levels on its highways, and in 2018, they determined that on average the traffic varied from 1,380 vehicles per day slightly west of the junction with US-75 to 4,360 vehicles per day along the overlap with US-59. The second highest was 3,890 vehicles per day slightly west of the junction with US-69. K-47 is not included in the National Highway System, but does connect to the National Highway System at its junction with US-400 east of Fredonia, US-75 in Altoona, US-169 north of Thayer and its eastern terminus at US-69 in Franklin. All but  of K-47's alignment is maintained by KDOT. The section of K-47 within Girard is maintained by the city.

Wilson County
K-47's western terminus is at a continuation as Washington Avenue at the Fredonia city limits. It continues east then meets US-400 at a roundabout intersection east of the city. K-47 then continues east through flat farmland for about  then crosses an unnamed creek by the junction of Kingman Road. The highway continues east for  then intersects Clear Creek Road. The roadway continues through flat lands with a few houses for  then intersects Million Dollar Highway. K-47 continues east for about  then curves slightly southeast as it enters a forested area. After about  the highway begins to curve northeast. The landscape surrounding the highway soon opens up to farmland as the highway resumes a direct east course. K-47 then crosses the Verdigris River roughly  later. The highway continues east for  then expands to four-lanes and enters Altoona as 13th Street. The highway proceeds east through the city for  then has an at-grade crossing with a Union Pacific Railroad track. K-47 then intersects US-75 Business  later. The roadway continues east for a short distance and intersects US-75 at a four-way stop. The highway continues east through flat farmlands with scattered areas of trees for  then intersects Scott Road. The roadway continues for roughly  then crosses Big Cedar Creek. K-47 continues east through flat lands for  then intersects Wichita Road. The highway then crosses over Chetopa Creek about  later. The roadway continues east for  then enters into Neosho County.

Neosho County
The highway continues east through flat farmlands for  until it meets US-169 south of Chanute. K-47 then has an at-grade crossing with a Kansas and Oklahoma Railroad track then crosses over Elk Creek  later. The highway continues for about  through flat mostly open land then crosses Little Elk Creek. The roadway proceeds another  and intersects Jackson Road, which travels south to Galesurg. K-47 travels another roughly  where it crosses Rock Creek. K-47 turns south and begins to overlap US-59 for  then turns east and leaves US-59. The highway soon crosses Ogeese Creek the crosses over a Union Pacific Railroad track  later. K-47 soon intersects Queens Road then curves slightly southeast and begins to parallel the Neosho River. The highway then crosses the river and curves back east. K-47 enters St. Paul about  later as Washington Street. The highway crosses an old railroad grade then enters into a residential area at the intersection with Front Street. The roadway continues east for  then intersects Main Street. K-47 proceeds another  then exits the city. The highway soon crosses over Flat Rock Creek, then crosses over Downey Creek about  later. The roadway continues through for  before intersecting Wallace Road. K-47 then crosses over Brogan Creek and then enters into Crawford County about  later.

Crawford County
The highway continues through flat farmland for  then crosses Murphy Creek. After about  the roadway intersects 40th Street, which travels south to K-126 and McCune. K-47 continues east for  then enters forested area and crosses Hickory Creek. The trees clear and the highway enters the unincorporated community of Greenbush. The roadway then intersects the southern terminus of K-3 about  later. K-3 travels north to Hepler, as K-47 continues east and soon crosses Elm Creek. The roadway continues through flat farmland for approximately  before crossing Lightning Creek. K-47 continues east for  before entering Girard as St. John Street. The highway continues for about  then passes a hospital, where it expands to four lanes. The roadway enters a more residential area and then after  intersects K-7, also known as Summit Street. K-47 continues east for  then has an at-grade crossing with a BNSF Railway track. Approximately  later the highway downgrades to two lanes as it exits the city. K-47 continues east for  then crosses Second Cow Creek then Clear Creek. The highway continues through farmland for  then passes through unincorporated community of Edison. K-47 then reaches its eastern terminus at US-69 and US-69 Business (US-69 Bus.) in Franklin, south of Arma.

History

Early roads
Prior to the formation of the Kansas state highway system, there were auto trails, which were an informal network of marked routes that existed in the United States and Canada in the early part of the 20th century. The highway's western terminus followed the former Capitol Route, which ran from Austin, Texas to Omaha, Nebraska. In Kansas the Capitol Route began at Oklahoma border and travelled north through Independence, Lyndon, Topeka, and Horton to the Nebraska border. K-47 crosses US-169, which closely follows the former Oil Belt Route and one of the former Ozark Trails. K-47 overlaps the section of US-59, which closely follows the former King of Trails, which ran from Galveston and Brownsville in Texas to Winnipeg, Manitoba. In Girard crosses the former Jefferson Highway, which ran from New Orleans, Louisiana to Winnipeg, Manitoba, and the former Kansas City-Ft. Scott-Miami-Tulsa Short Line. The eastern terminus closely follows one of the former Ozark Trails.

Establishment and realignments

In 1926, the section between Fredonia and Altoona was designated K-39, and the section from Erie to Girard was designated as K-57. By 1928, K-47 was established to a highway that ran from K-96 and K-39 in Fredonia northeast to US-75 by Buffalo. By 1929, it was slightly realigned to pass through Benedict, and the southern terminus was extended west over K-39 to Altoona then east over a new highway to K-16 south of Earleton. By 1930, K-47 was truncated to end by Fredonia, with the former section of K-47 between there and Benedict becoming a realignment of K-39 and former section between Benedict and Buffalo being removed from the state highway system. By 1936, K-16 was decommissioned and became US-169. Between 1933 and 1936, K-96 was realigned to travel north from Fredonia along K-39. Then in a July 1, 1937, resolution, it was approved to extend K-47 from Fredonia in a northwest direction, along the former alignment of K-96, through New Albany to K-96. In a January 23, 1946, resolution, it was approved to extend K-47 from US-169 east to US-59 south of Erie. The extension was completed between 1948 and 1950. In a September 9, 1953, resolution, it was approved to truncate K-47's western terminus to end at K-39 and K-96 in Fredonia.

Just west of Altoona, K-47 turned south onto modern day Million Dollar Highway. After about  it turned east onto 1025 Road, which it followed into the city. In a December 28, 1949, resolution, it was approved to realign the highway to travel directly east into Altoona. That month, condemnation proceedings began to acquire the right-of-way for the new section of highway. In March 1954, a $155,185 (equivalent to $ in ) contract was awarded to Hixson & Lehenbauer of Topeka to complete the project. The realignment was completed in 1955. In June 1964, construction began to rebuild the highway between Fredonia and the section rebuilt by Altoona in 1955. Sight distances were improved, curves were eliminated, and grades were reduced by making rock cuts. The new section was completed in early October 1965. US-75 originally ran north-south along Quincy Street through Altoona. In September 1963, there was a public hearing to discuss the realignment of US-75 by Altoona. Then in a December 2, 1964, resolution, it was approved to build a new alignment of US-75 slightly east of the old one. The old alignment was redesignated as US-75 Business. The new $327,000 (equivalent to $ in ) alignment of US-75 was completed in August 1967.

In a December 1, 1994, resolution, it was approved to establish US-400 in Kansas, which followed K-96 to Fredonia then turned east and followed K-47 to US-59. In a May 3, 1995, resolution, it was approved to build a new highway between northwest of Fredonia and Neodesha and to move K-96 and US-400 onto it. At that time the overlap between K-47 and US-400 was eliminated. In a December 3, 1998, resolution, it was approved to truncate K-96 to end at US-400 by Wichita. The realignment of US-400 was completed by 1999. In a May 14, 2003, resolution, it was approved to truncate K-57 to end at US-169 by Colony. At this time K-47 was extended east over the former K-57 to US-69 by Franklin.

Major intersections

Notes

See also

 List of state highways in Kansas
 List of highways numbered 47

References

External links

 Kansas Department of Transportation State Map
 KDOT: Historic State Maps

047
Transportation in Wilson County, Kansas
Transportation in Neosho County, Kansas
Transportation in Crawford County, Kansas